Nader Ghobeishavi (born September 19, 1975), is an Iranian football coach and a former player, who played as a goalkeeper. He currently works as a goalkeeping coach with Foolad in the Iran Pro League.

Club career
Ghobeishavi Previously played for Aboomoslem and Rah Ahan, both of whom participate in Iran Pro League.

International
In 2003, Ghobeishavi was summoned by Iranian Football Federation to attend a national camp in preparation for the Asian Nations Cup.

References

Living people
Iranian footballers
Esteghlal Ahvaz players
F.C. Aboomoslem players
Rah Ahan players
1974 births
Shahrdari Bandar Abbas players
Machine Sazi F.C. players
Association football goalkeepers